The University of Artois (French: Université d'Artois) is a public university situated in the  Nord and Pas-de-Calais  departments of northern France.

It is situated on 5 campuses in Arras, Béthune, Douai, Lens and Liévin.

The University of Artois is a member of the European Doctoral College Lille-Nord-Pas de Calais and the University of Lille Nord de France group of universities.

Academics
The university offers bachelors, vocational bachelors, masters, and doctoral degrees in the arts and humanities, as well as in various STEM fields.

The university also offers BUT and DEUST certifications in several fields, including business, management, mechanical engineering, and technology.

Composition
The University of Artois consists of 8 faculties and 2 technology institutes:

Arras campus
 Faculty of History, Geography, and Heritage Studies
 Faculty of Foreign Languages
 Faculty of Letters and Arts 
 Faculty of Economics, Management, Administration, and Social Sciences

Béthune campus
 Béthune Institute of Technology
 Faculty of Applied Science

Douai campus
 Faculty of Law

Lens campus
 Faculty of Sciences 
 Lens Institute of Technology :Commerce, Management, IT, Digital Media Studies, Health Services

Liévin campus
 Faculty of Sports and Physical Education

Notable faculty
 Jean-Pierre Arrignon (1943-2021) - historian
 Laurent Warlouzet (born 1978) - historian

Notable alumni
 Bruno Bilde (born 1976) - politician 
 Bruno Studer (born 1978) - politician
 Hugues Fabrice Zango (born 1993) - Burkinabé athlete who specialises in the triple jump and the long jump

See also
 List of public universities in France by academy
 European Doctoral College Lille Nord-Pas de Calais

References

University of Lille Nord de France
Universities in Hauts-de-France
Education in Arras
Buildings and structures in Arras
Educational institutions established in 1992
1992 establishments in France